Cuterebra lepivora is a species of new world skin bot fly in the family Oestridae. Its larvae are usually parasites of cottontail rabbits.  Adult males can be territorial.

References

Oestridae
Articles created by Qbugbot
Insects described in 1898
Parasitic arthropods of mammals